Craig Butler (born December 19, 1988) is a former professional Canadian football defensive back and current special teams coordinator and assistant defensive backs coach for the Hamilton Tiger-Cats of the Canadian Football League (CFL). He played for Saint Thomas Aquinas Flames high school football team and played CIS football for the Western Ontario Mustangs where he co-won the Dr. Claude Brown memorial trophy for top male student athlete. Butler was also named an OUA All-Star and All-Canadian in his senior season. He was also a member of the Saskatchewan Roughriders. As well, Butler was recognized as a member of the CFL All-Decade team, 2010-2019.

Professional career

Saskatchewan Roughriders
He was drafted 12th overall by the Saskatchewan Roughriders in the 2011 CFL Draft and signed with the team on June 1, 2011. In his first season with the Roughriders, Butler was named a West division All-Star. Butler spent three seasons with the Riders and won the 101st Grey Cup to conclude the 2013 CFL season. In his three seasons with the Riders, Butler amassed 135 tackles, 34 special teams tackles, 4 quarterback sacks, 11 interceptions and 6 fumble recoveries.

Hamilton Tiger-Cats
On February 11, 2014, the first day of CFL free-agency, Butler signed a contract with the Hamilton Tiger-Cats of the Canadian Football League. He was named a divisional all-star at safety in 2014 and played in his second consecutive Grey Cup, a loss to the Calgary Stampeders. He had a career high in sacks with four in 2015, while only playing in 15 games, en route to being named a league all-star for the first time in his career. He missed all of the 2016 season due to injury and only played in two games in 2017 before announcing his retirement on September 2, 2017.

Coaching career
Immediately following his retirement announcement, Butler was named as an assistant coach for the Hamilton Tiger-Cats mid-season on September 2, 2017. He was promoted to defensive backs coach for the 2019 season. After two seasons in that role, he was then named the special teams coordinator and assistant defensive backs coach on February 7, 2022.

References

External links
Hamilton Tiger-Cats bio

1988 births
Living people
Canadian football defensive backs
Hamilton Tiger-Cats coaches
Hamilton Tiger-Cats players
Players of Canadian football from Ontario
Saskatchewan Roughriders players
Sportspeople from London, Ontario
Western Mustangs football players